Nguyễn Thị Thúy (23 August 1990, Hanoi) is a Vietnamese weightlifter. She competed at the 2012 Summer Olympics in the Women's 53 kg, finishing 8th.

References

External links
 

1990 births
Living people
Olympic weightlifters of Vietnam
Weightlifters at the 2012 Summer Olympics
Weightlifters at the 2010 Asian Games
Weightlifters at the 2018 Asian Games
Vietnamese female weightlifters
Southeast Asian Games bronze medalists for Vietnam
Southeast Asian Games medalists in weightlifting
Competitors at the 2011 Southeast Asian Games
Asian Games competitors for Vietnam
Competitors at the 2019 Southeast Asian Games
Southeast Asian Games silver medalists for Vietnam
Sportspeople from Hanoi
21st-century Vietnamese women
20th-century Vietnamese women